United Nations Security Council resolution 1591, adopted on 29 March 2005, after recalling resolutions 1547 (2004), 1556 (2004), 1564 (2004), 1574 (2004), 1585 (2005), 1588 (2005) and 1590 (2005) on the situation in Sudan, the council placed a travel ban and asset freeze on those "impeding the peace process" in Darfur.

The resolution was adopted by 12 votes in favour to none against and three abstentions from Algeria, China and Russia, who all expressed objections to the use of international sanctions and believed that the resolution failed to recognise the progress made by the Sudanese government.

Observations
In the preamble of the resolution, the council welcomed of the Comprehensive Peace Agreement in Nairobi, Kenya, by the Sudanese government and Sudan People's Liberation Army/Movement (SPLA/M). It recognised that the parties to the agreement had to bring about peace and prevent further violations of human rights and of the ceasefire in Darfur. The security council was also concerned about the humanitarian situation and the safety of aid workers, and called on all parties to co-operate with the African Union Mission in Darfur.

UN Panel of Experts concerning Sudan
The United Nations Panel of experts concerning the Sudan was established by the UN Security Council Resolution 1591 March 2005. Its mandate is to among others monitor the Arms Embargo on Darfur. Their reports can be found at the following link: . Mr. Thomas W. Bifwoli was coordinator of the panel from 5 December 2007 until 15 October 2008. Mr Bifwoli had been originally appointed by the UN secretary General Kofi Annan in May 2006 to serve on the UN Panel of Experts as the Customs and Border control expert.

Acts
Acting under Chapter VII of the United Nations Charter, the security council deplored the actions of the Sudanese government, rebel and other armed groups in Darfur for failing in their commitments to the council and continuing ceasefire violations. There were airstrikes by the government, which had also not disarmed the Janjaweed militia. In this regard, the council established a Committee to oversee the implementation of Security Council demands against the parties involved in the conflict, and investigate individuals responsible for human rights violations. It was instructed to report regularly to the council on the situation.

The resolution placed restrictions on those "impeding the peace process" in Darfur, including a travel ban and asset freeze, to enter into force within 30 days unless the parties complied with the security council. The council concluded by reiterating that further measures would be taken in the event of non-compliance by any of the parties.

See also
 African Union Mission in Sudan
 African Union – United Nations Hybrid Operation in Darfur
 International response to the War in Darfur
 List of United Nations Security Council Resolutions 1501 to 1600 (2003–2005)
 Timeline of the War in Darfur
 United Nations Mission in Sudan
 War in Darfur

References

External links
 
Text of the Resolution at undocs.org

 1591
2005 in Sudan
 1591
United Nations Security Council sanctions regimes
March 2005 events